Deborah McCormick ( Henry, born January 8, 1974) is an American curler from Rio, Wisconsin.  Although born in Canada, McCormick moved to Madison, Wisconsin when she was very young. McCormick is a World Champion and four-time Olympian.

Career
McCormick had an impressive junior career, winning two silvers and a bronze at various World Junior Curling Championships.  Early in her adult curling career she played in two World Championships: as an alternate in 1996 for Lisa Schoeneberg's silver medal winning team, and in 2001 she was a third for Kari Erickson's sixth place team.

McCormick skipped the United States to a World Championship in 2003. She defeated Canada, skipped by Colleen Jones, in the final. It was the first time the US had won a World Championships in women's curling and was McCormick's first international tournament as a skip. She returned to the Worlds in 2006 and won silver.  McCormick defended her 2006 US title in 2007 by defeating Cassandra Johnson's rink 9–3. She went on to win the 2008 & 2009 National Championships/Olympic Trials.

McCormick has also participated in four Olympic games. At the 1998 Winter Olympics, she played second for Schoeneberg's fifth place team and at the 2002 Winter Olympics she played third for Erickson's fourth place team. She skipped the US Women's Olympic Team at the 2010 Winter Olympics, finishing 10th. She joined Erika Brown's rink in 2012, and after their win at the 2013 United States Women's Curling Championship, Brown and her team were qualified to participate at the 2014 United States Olympic Curling Trials. They finished first in the round robin standings and defeated former teammate Allison Pottinger in a best-of-three series final to clinch the berth to the Olympics.

Personal life 
McCormick posed for Ana Arce's "Fire on Ice" 2007 Team Sponsorship Calendar to promote women's curling.
She is the daughter of Wally Henry.

Teams

References

External links
 
 

1974 births
Living people
American female curlers
Olympic curlers of the United States
Curlers at the 1998 Winter Olympics
Curlers at the 2002 Winter Olympics
Curlers at the 2010 Winter Olympics
World curling champions
Canadian women curlers
Canadian emigrants to the United States
Curlers from Saskatoon
Sportspeople from Madison, Wisconsin
Curlers at the 2014 Winter Olympics
Continental Cup of Curling participants
American curling champions
People from Columbia County, Wisconsin
21st-century American women